Kelowna—Lake Country is a provincial electoral district for the Legislative Assembly of British Columbia, Canada. It should not be confused with the federal electoral district of Kelowna—Lake Country, which encompasses a somewhat larger area.

Demographics

Geography
As of the 2020 provincial election, Kelowna—Lake Country comprises the northeastern portion of the Regional District of Central Okanagan. This includes the entire area of the district municipality of Lake Country and the northern area of Kelowna. It is located in southern British Columbia.

History

1999 redistribution
Changes from Okanagan East to Kelowna-Lake Country include:
removal of area south and southeast of Kelowna
addition of area north of Kelowna

MLAs

History

Member of the Legislative Assembly 
The Member of the Legislative Assembly (MLA) is Norm Letnick a former city councilor.

Election results

References 

 B.C. Votes 2017: Kelowna-Lake Country riding profile. CBC News. March 24, 2017. Retrieved April 25, 2017.

External links 
BC Stats Profile - 2001
Results of 2001 election (pdf)
2001 Expenditures
Website of the Legislative Assembly of British Columbia

British Columbia provincial electoral districts
Lake Country
Politics of Kelowna